{{DISPLAYTITLE:C10H11NO2}}
The molecular formula C10H11NO2 (molar mass: 177.20 g/mol, exact mass: 177.0790 u) may refer to:

 Acetoacetanilide
 MDAI (5,6-methylenedioxy-2-aminoindane)
 TDIQ